Free convolution is the free probability analog of the classical notion of convolution of probability measures. Due to the non-commutative nature of free probability theory, one has to talk separately about additive and multiplicative free convolution, which arise from addition and multiplication of free random variables (see below; in the classical case, what would be the analog of free multiplicative convolution can be reduced to additive convolution by passing to logarithms of random variables). These operations have some interpretations in terms of empirical spectral measures of random matrices.

The notion of free convolution was introduced by Voiculescu.

Free additive convolution 

Rectangular free additive convolution 

The rectangular free additive convolution (with ratio )  has also been defined in the non commutative probability framework by Benaych-Georges and admits the following random matrices interpretation.

Free multiplicative convolution 

A similar definition can be made in the case of laws  supported on the unit circle , with an orthogonal or unitary random matrices interpretation.

Explicit computations of multiplicative free convolution can be carried out using complex-analytic techniques and the S-transform.

Applications of free convolution 

 Free convolution can be used to give a proof of the free central limit theorem.
 Free convolution can be used to compute the laws and spectra of sums or products of random variables which are free.  Such examples include: random walk operators on free groups (Kesten measures); and asymptotic distribution of eigenvalues of sums or products of independent random matrices.

Through its applications to random matrices, free convolution has some strong connections with other works on G-estimation of Girko.

The applications in wireless communications, finance and biology have provided a useful framework  when the number of observations is of the same order as the dimensions  of the system.

See also 

 Convolution
 Free probability
 Random matrix

References

 "Free Deconvolution for Signal Processing Applications", O. Ryan and M. Debbah, ISIT 2007, pp. 1846–1850
James A. Mingo, Roland Speicher: Free Probability and Random Matrices. Fields Institute Monographs, Vol. 35, Springer, New York, 2017.
D.-V. Voiculescu, N. Stammeier, M. Weber (eds.): Free Probability and Operator Algebras, Münster Lectures in Mathematics, EMS, 2016

External links
Alcatel Lucent Chair on Flexible Radio
http://www.cmapx.polytechnique.fr/~benaych
http://folk.uio.no/oyvindry
 survey articles of Roland Speicher on free probability.

Signal processing
Combinatorics
Functional analysis
Free probability theory
Free algebraic structures